Alfreð Gíslason (born 7 September 1959) is an Icelandic handball coach and former player. He is the current head coach of the German men's national team and former coach of the Icelandic men's national team. His coaching career started in 1997 with KA and he later coached THW Kiel for 11 seasons. He was the Icelandic Sportsperson of the Year in 1989 and was named to the National Olympic and Sports Association of Iceland Hall of Fame in 2019.

National team career
Alfreð played 190 games with the Icelandic national handball team, scoring 542 goals.

Personal life
Alfreð was married to Kara Guðrún Melstað until her death on 31 May 2021.

References

1959 births
Living people
Alfred Gislason
Alfred Gislason
Knattspyrnufélag Akureyrar handball players
Alfred Gislason
Handball players at the 1984 Summer Olympics
Handball players at the 1988 Summer Olympics
Alfred Gislason
Alfred Gislason
Handball coaches of international teams